

Introduction 

Mountain Rose Herbs is an American grower, processor, distributor, and retailer of herbs, spices, teas, essential oils and DIY ingredients used in herbalism. Founded in 1987, the company is based in Eugene, Oregon. Mountain Rose Herbs is known for organic, sustainably sourced, and wild harvested products. The company was the first fair trade certified supplier of these products in the United States. By 2010, it was the second-largest distributor of organic dried herbs in the nation. The e-commerce company opened its first retail location, Mountain Rose Herbs Mercantile, in 2016 in downtown Eugene, selling organic botanicals and DIY supplies.

History
Herbalist, educator, and author Rosemary Gladstar established what would become Mountain Rose Herbs in 1987 in Northern California, as a mail-order company that provided supplies for students at the California School of Herbal Studies. In 1991, herbalist Julie Bailey purchased the small business. She continued to run Mountain Rose Herbs from her Humboldt County, California home, filling orders by mail. The company grew steadily through the 1990s and adopted rigorous guidelines for harvesting of wild plants. In 1997, Mountain Rose Herbs moved to a larger residence in North San Juan, California. In 2000, environmental activist, Shawn Donnille, was promoted to management. He obtained organic certification for the company, and built the first Mountain Rose Herbs website in order to sell products online.

In 2001, Shawn Donnille became a part owner of Mountain Rose Herbs. That year they moved the business to Pleasant Hill, Oregon to be closer to the company's farm operations, wild harvesters, and processors. This move allowed Bailey and Donnille to create a full-time laboratory and quality control department. The home-based retailer became a certified organic processor through Oregon Tilth in 2002.

Between 2001 and 2010, Mountain Rose Herbs experienced steady growth, averaging between 25% and 45% each year, and soon grew out of their Pleasant Hill location.

In July 2010, the retailer moved to their current facility, the former Burley Design bicycle trailer factory in west Eugene. This 60,600-square-foot factory and the lease of a separate 10,000-square-foot building next door, tripled the retailer's space.

Mountain Rose Herbs has been recognized multiple times for ethical business practices. In 2010, the company was a finalist for the Oregon Ethics in Business Award. In 2011, it was honored with the Oregon Organic Coalition of Excellence award. The Oregon Sustainability Board selected Mountain Rose Herbs as the 2012 Grand Champion for the Governor's Sustainability Award, recognizing the company as a leader in socially and environmentally responsible business practices. In 2013, Shawn Donnille was a recipient of a 20 under 40 Award, for helping to "foster growth from an ‘out of the garage’ operation into one of Eugene's largest and most dynamic employers."

As of 2015, Mountain Rose Herbs was working with fifteen certified organic farms throughout the Pacific Northwest.

In January 2017, Mountain Rose Herbs purchased the assets of Eugene herbal products company, Terra Firma Botanicals. And Shawn Donnille became an equal partner 50/50 in the business. Mountain Rose Herbs now employs over 200 people in six separate Eugene facilities.

Mountain Rose Herbs expanded their facilities again in 2018 with the opening of a new milling facility in West Eugene, giving them full, hands-on control over the milling process for their products for the first time.

In 2020, Mountain Rose Herbs, like so many businesses around the world, was impacted by the COVID-19 pandemic. To put the company back on a growth trajectory, Shawn Donnille came out of partial retirement to step in as CEO and restructure the business and leadership team. On September 30, 2020, after 30 years of leadership, Julie Bailey retired and passed full ownership of Mountain Rose Herbs to Shawn Donnille.

In December 2020, Mountain Rose Herbs purchased the Phoenix Industrial Park in Eugene, marking the fourth time in twenty years that the business has outgrown its facilities. This purchase will allow the company to consolidate their six separate facilities into one 12-acre campus and will provide 205,000 square feet of operational space. Bringing the separate facilities together into one campus will streamline operations and communications, significantly reducing the business's carbon footprint. “We are continually striving for a carbon-neutral business model,” said Shawn Donnille.

Products
Mountain Rose Herbs carries approximately 1,500 botanical items, totaling 6,000 different sizes and finished products. These include bulk herbs, spices, culinary salts, sprouting seeds, teas, aromatherapy products, extracts, tinctures, salves, balms, natural bath and skincare products, and books, tools and other essentials for DIY projects.

Herbal Education
As part of their ongoing support for herbal education, the company established the Free Herbalism Project, an annual community event with botanically inspired lectures from experts in the field. Additionally, the company provides educational podcasts called Herbal Radio and how-to videos on YouTube.

In 2011, Mountain Rose Herbs founded Rootstalk Festival, a three-day benefit festival that brought together 40 experts and environmental groups to present classes on sustainable living, herbal medicine, wilderness skills, urban farming, and homesteading projects.

In 2015, Mountain Rose Herbs and Oregon Tilth presented a free Organic Land Care Peer Learning Session for landscape professionals.

Community 
In 2009, Mountain Rose Herbs established the Mountain Rose River Project, a grassroots action team. Each year, employees carry out six to eight restoration projects through a Paid Time for Community Involvement program. The company partners with the state of Oregon, federal government, and nonprofit agencies to work on projects primarily focusing on local riparian ecosystems, stream health, and fish habitat.

Since 2012, Mountain Rose Herbs has maintained a comprehensive fair trade certification in accordance with the IMO Fair for Life standard. The company has worked directly with organic herb and spice growers through its Fair for Life Project. This project helps small organic farms in India comply with fair trade requirements by acting as mandator of the project, funding the certification process, and paying fair trade premiums for the goods.

In 2017, Mountain Rose Herbs was awarded the Innovation in Philanthropy Award from the Portland Business Journal in recognition for the Mountain Rose River Project, and for its charitable giving and nonprofit partnerships.

Sustainability 
Mountain Rose Herbs advocates for organic farming, the environment, and fair trade. Most products are certified organic, all packaging is environmentally friendly, bottles and labels are made from post-consumer plastics and paper, tea boxes are compostable, and printing is done with soy-based inks. Additionally, the company conserves water with a satellite-controlled irrigation system, and a bioswale filters runoff water from the roof and pavement.

Mountain Rose Herbs was the first Oregon company to receive Zero Waste Facility Certification. Companies that are awarded the Zero Waste Facility Certification must meet all local, state, and federal waste regulations, and also divert at least 90% of all non-hazardous waste from landfills and incineration. Mountain Rose Herbs holds the highest level of certification: Platinum.

In 2014, the retailer became the first company in Eugene to be salmon-safe certified.

In 2015, Mountain Rose Herbs installed over 100 photovoltaic solar panels to generate electricity for the main facility in Eugene. The 25 kWh solar array installed on the roof produces an estimated 32,604 kWh of power.

Additionally, Mountain Rose Herbs is a Bicycle Friendly Business, and offers an Alternative Commute Program that pays cash incentives to employees who carpool with fellow staff members, use public transportation, bicycle, or walk to work.

The company has received numerous awards for its sustainability leadership, including The 100 Best Green Companies to Work for in Oregon, the Beyond Toxics Visionary Leader Award, and the Charities@Work Corporate Excellence Award for overall excellence in employee engagement and corporate social responsibility.

References

Companies based in Eugene, Oregon